The Biblical Church (Japanese: 聖書キリスト教会, Seisho Kirisuto Kyōkai) is a Protestant Christian denomination in Japan that was founded by Reverend Reiji Oyama (尾山令仁牧師) since 1953. The group grew up around him to a Presbyterian Reformed denomination. In 2004 it had 19 congregations and 908 members. The Biblical Church subscribes the Apostles Creed, Athanasian Creed, Nicene Creed, and the Reformed Confessions like the Heidelberg Catechism, Second Helvetic Confession and the Westminster Confession. The denomination does ordain women to ministry. It is a member of the Japan Evangelical Association.

External links 
聖書キリスト教会

References 

Christian organizations established in 1953
Christian evangelical denominations in Japan
Reformed denominations in Japan